Rosalia Pipitone (born 3 August 1985) is an Italian goalkeeper. She plays for Roma in the women's Serie A.

In 2018 she played for A.S. Roma Women.

International career
In 2018, she was called up to be part of the national team. She retired from international football in August 2019.

References

External links

1985 births
Living people
Italian women's footballers
Italy women's international footballers
Serie A (women's football) players
A.S. Roma (women) players
Footballers from Rome
2019 FIFA Women's World Cup players
Women's association football goalkeepers
Footballers from Palermo
Res Roma players